Writers & Lovers is a 2020 novel by American author Lily King. This is King’s fifth novel and follows an aspiring writer Casey Peabody as she strives to move from one phase of her life into the next amidst grief, joy, romance, and artistic fulfillment.  The story also incorporates the game of chess into the storyline.

Synopsis 
In 1997 Casey Peabody, a woman in her 30s, struggles to define her life as she is deeply in debt, feels uninspired to finish the novel she is working on, and is still reeling from her mother's untimely death a few months earlier. Shortly after her mother's death she was accepted to a writer's residency. Unable to delay Casey accepted the position and fell in love with a fellow writer named Luke who was also suffering from the death of his child. After the residency Casey learns he is still married and ends their relationship.

Casey is friends with Muriel, another struggling writer who participates in a workshop run by Oscar, a middle-aged widower. Muriel invites Casey to Oscar's book launch where she meets a fellow writer named Silas whom she immediately connects with as he also struggled with the untimely death of his sister. However, Silas departs for a long impromptu road trip just before their date, leaving Casey hurt.

At her waitressing job, Casey serves Oscar and his two young sons. Casey is charmed by his children and when Oscar asks her on a date, she accepts. Shortly after this, Silas returns. Casey is charmed by Oscar's solidity but feels a strong physical connection to Silas. She decides that she is sick of Silas' flightiness and begins to seriously date Oscar.

Casey finally finishes her book and sends it to agents. To her surprise, an assistant agent offers to represent the book and make Casey her first client. Casey accepts. Nevertheless things begin to go badly for her. Her landlord reveals he is selling the land she lives on and she will soon be homeless. Oscar offers to let her live with him and his boys but she struggles with committing to their relationship as he shows flashes of arrogance and disinterest in her life. After a confrontation with an abrasive cook, Casey loses her job.

Casey has a cancer scare. After finding out that the lump in her breast is a lymph node she decides to leave Oscar for good and pursue Silas. To her surprise a teaching job Muriel set up that Casey thought she botched comes through. Casey's agent starts a bidding war for her novel and it sells for enough money that Casey is able to pay off her debts.

After Silas admits that he backed off after learning that Casey was dating Oscar she tells him that she and Oscar have broken up and the two finally begin a relationship.

Reception 
Writers & Lovers received positive critical response. Maureen Corrigan of NPR praised it as “a funny and compassionate novel about the cost of sticking with the same dream for what may be too long.” Ron Charles described the novel as “an absolute delight, the kind of happiness that sometimes slingshots out of despair with such force you can’t help but cheer, amazed.”

References

2020 American novels
Grove Press books
Novels about writers
Novels set in Massachusetts